George Austen (1731–1805) was a cleric of the Church of England, rector of Deane and Steventon in Hampshire. He is remembered as the father of Jane Austen.

Early life
Austen was the son of William Austen, of Tonbridge, Kent. He and his sister Philadelphia were orphaned when George was nine years old, and he was taken under the wing of his wealthy uncle Francis Austen. He attended Tonbridge School and St John's College, Oxford.

After matriculating at St John's on 2 July 1747, aged sixteen, Austen graduated BA on 12 February 1751, promoted to MA by seniority in 1754. He was a proctor in 1759 and graduated as a Bachelor of Divinity in 1760.

Career

In 1764, the living at Deane was purchased for Austen by his uncle Francis. The living at Steventon was "given to him by his cousin Mr. Knight".

Toward the end of 1800, Austen retired and the Steventon living was transferred to his son James. With his wife and daughters Cassandra and Jane he went to live in Bath, Somerset, and died there in 1805.

His granddaughter Anna Lefroy later recalled:

Marriage and family

Austen met Cassandra Leigh while he was a student at Oxford. They married in 1764 and began their married life living in the rectory at Deane; in 1771 they moved to Steventon Parsonage, the birthplace of their daughter Jane. They had eight children:
 James Austen (1765–1819)
 George Austen (born 1766) 
 Edward Austen Knight (1767–1852)
 Henry Thomas Austen (1771–1850) 
 Cassandra Austen (1773–1845)
 Sir Francis Austen (1774–1865)
 Jane Austen (1775–1817)
 Charles John Austen  (1779–1852)
Their second child, George Austen, suffered from severe epilepsy, and did not grow up in the family home.

Austen's wife came from a clerical family, with links to St John's College, Oxford, and was able to claim descent from one of the college founders, giving her sons the right to attend the college without paying for tuition, as founder's kin. James and Henry Thomas Austen both attended St. John's College.

References

1731 births
1805 deaths
Austen family
Alumni of St John's College, Oxford
People educated at Tonbridge School
18th-century English Anglican priests
People from Steventon, Hampshire
People from Deane, Hampshire
English Protestant ministers and clergy
Jane Austen